The liocichlas are a group of birds in the genus of the same name, Liocichla, from the family Leiothrichidae. They are found in Asia from India to China. They belong to a clade also containing at least the Leiothrix, the barwings, the minlas and the sibias. Among these, they are an early offshoot, or basal lineage.

Taxonomy
Speciation in the group is thought to have begun with the ancestral species originating somewhere in southern China, making L. steerii the basal species. The lineage consisting of L. ripponi and L. phoenicea are thought to have had a split in the Pleistocene (0.07–1.88 Ma) with a similar split of the other lineage leading to L. bugunorum and L. omeiensis separated by the Hengduan mountains.

Species
The genus contains five species:

See also
 Bird species new to science described in the 2000s

References

 
Bird genera
Endemic birds of East Asia
Leiothrichidae